Jeffrey Skolnick is an American computational biologist. He is currently a Georgia Institute of Technology School of Biology Professor, the Director of the Center for the Study of Systems Biology, the Mary and Maisie Gibson Chair, the Georgia Research Alliance Eminent Scholar in Computational Systems Biology, the Director of the Integrative BioSystems Institute, and was previously the Scientific Advisor at Intellimedix.

He has focused on the development of computational algorithms and their application to proteomes for the prediction of protein structure and function, the prediction of small molecule ligand-protein interactions with applications to drug discovery,  the prediction of off-target uses of existing drugs, and the exploration of the interplay between protein physics and evolution in determining protein structure and function.

Skolnick is most known for demonstrating that the number of ligand binding pockets in proteins is quite small, thereby justifying the likelihood that large scale drug repurposing will work. This combined with the ability to use predicted as well as experimental structures in virtual ligand screening at higher accuracy and precision than existing approaches will enable FDA approved drugs with novel mechanisms of action to be identified computationally with a high likelihood of experimental success.

He is also known for his unique teaching methodology and interactive pedagogy to simplify the comprehension of complex concepts in computational chemistry.

Major Discoveries

Completeness of the library of protein structures and interactions 

Skolnick was first to demonstrate that the library of single domain protein structures is likely complete and that the observed folds in nature arise from the confinement of dense polymer chains. He further demonstrated that the confinement of these dense polymer chains plus hydrodynamic interactions were the dominant contributor to diffusive processes in cells. Moreover, that the hydrodynamic interactions introduced large scale temporal and spatial correlations that may have important functional consequences.

Ligand homology modeling 
He also pioneered the field of ligand homology modeling with his threading based, FINDSITE approach for protein function inference, binding site prediction and virtual ligand screening. The research showed that remotely related proteins identified by threading often share a common ligand binding site occupied by chemically similar ligands that contain strongly conserved anchor functional groups as well as a variable region that accounts for their binding specificity. These insights enable low-resolution predicted structures to be used for ligand screening/binding pose prediction, with comparable accuracy as with high-resolution experimental structures. In virtual ligand screening, the latest version, FINDSITEcomb, was shown to work far better than more traditional virtual screening approaches on both predicted and high resolution experimental structures.

TASSER protein structure prediction 
He also developed the TASSER protein structure prediction approach, whose variants were among the top performers in CASP in the 2000s and the basis for the I-TASSER service. TASSER was among the first methods whose models were closer to the native structure than the starting template.

Odijk-Skolnick-Fixman electrostatic persistence length 
Skolnick's Ph.D. thesis " “Investigations on a Rod Like Polyelectrolyte Model", along with Fixman and Odijk, developed a theory for the electrostatic persistence length in polyelectrolytes now known as the Odijk-Skolnick-Fixman electrostatic persistence length which is still considered the classical benchmark.

Education 
Skolnick graduated summa cum laude from Washington University in 1975 with a Bachelor of Arts degree in chemistry. After Washington University, he moved on to Yale, where he graduated with a Master of Philosophy in Chemistry in 1977 and a Ph.D. in Chemistry just one year later in 1978.

His Ph.D. thesis, “Investigations on a Rod Like Polyelectrolyte Model”, focused on polymer statistical mechanics with Dr. Marshall Fixman. The methods described by Skolnick and Fixman and independently developed by Theo Odijk are still used as the basis for the electrostatic persistence length of polyelectrolytes.

Academic Recognition

Awards 
Skolnick has been recognized as a Fellow with the American Association for the Advancement of Science, the Biophysical Society, and the St. Louis Academy of Science.  He has also been awarded an Alfred P. Sloan Research Fellowship.

Journals and Editorial Boards 

He is also a cofounder of an early stage structural proteomics company, GeneFormatics, and his software has been commercialized by Tripos.

Professional career

Patents 

Patent No. 5,265,030 issued 11/23/1993. System and method for determining three-dimensional
structures of proteins. Jeffrey Skolnick and Andrzej Kolinski Inventors.

Patent No. 5,933,819 issued 8/3/1999. Prediction of relative binding motifs of biologically active
peptides and peptide mimetics. Jeffrey Skolnick, Mariusz Milik and Andrzej Kolinski Inventors.

Patent No. 6,631,332, issued 10/7/2003. Methods for using functional site descriptors and
predicting protein function. Jeffrey Skolnick and Jacquelyn S. Fetrow Inventors.

References

External links 
 Jeffrey Skolnick – Center for the Study of Systems Biology
 Our Team - Intellimedix

Systems biologists
Fellows of the American Association for the Advancement of Science
Computational biology
Georgia Tech people
Year of birth missing (living people)
Living people